The House Subcommittee on Higher Education and Workforce Investment is a standing subcommittee within the United States House Committee on Education and the Workforce. It was formerly known as the Subcommittee on 21st Century Competitiveness.

Jurisdiction
The Subcommittee's jurisdiction includes:

Education and workforce development beyond the high school level, including but not limited to: higher education generally, postsecondary student assistance and employment services, the Higher Education Act, including: campus safety and climate; adult education; postsecondary career and technical education, apprenticeship programs, and workforce development, including but not limited: to the Workforce Innovation and Opportunity Act, vocational rehabilitation, and workforce development programs from immigration fees; programs related to the arts and  humanities, museum and library services, and arts and artifacts indemnity; science and technology programs; and domestic volunteer programs and national service programs, including the Corporation for National and Community Service.

Members, 118th Congress

Historical membership rosters

115th Congress

116th Congress

117th Congress

References

External links
Subcommittee page

Education Education Reform